Veeran was an Indian actor and dubbing artist in Malayalam cinema. He has acted in more than 100 films. He appeared in character roles as well as villain roles.

Filmography

 Akalangalil Abhayam (1980)
 Rakthamillatha Manushyan (1979) as Sumathi's father
 Kalliyankattu Neeli (1979)
 Ezhunirangal (1979) as Raghava Panikker
 Bandhanam (1978)
 Avar Jeevikkunnu (1978)
 Rowdy Ramu (1978)
 Adavukal Pathinettu (1978)
 Kaithappoo (1978)
 Makampiranna Manka (1977)
 Kaduvaye Pidicha Kiduva (1977)
 Vishukkani (1977) as Collector Janardhanan Nair
 Anugraham (1977) as Joseph contractor
 Aparaadhi (1977) as Shankara Pillai
 Aayiram Janmangal (1976) as Panikkar
 Manimuzhakkam (1978) as Govinda Menon
 Chalanam (1975)
 Chattambikkalyaani (1975) as Thirumanassu/Gangster
 Prayanam (1975)
 Pulivaalu (1975)
 Kanyakumari (1974) as Somasundaram
 Nadeenadanmaare Aavasyamundu (1974)
 Raakkuyil (1973)
 Veendum Prabhaatham (1973)
 Nakhangal (1973)
 Panitheeratha Veedu (1973) as Kunjikannan
 Kaapaalika (1973) as Ittooppu
 Miss Mary (1972)
 Iniyoru Janmam Tharu (1972)
 Puthrakameshti (1972)
 Sree Guruvayoorappan (1972)
 Thettu (1971) as Kaippassery Paili
 Aabhijathyam (1971) as Barrister Pilla
 Puthanveedu (1971)
 Panchavan Kaadu (1971)
 Moonu Pookkal (1971)
 Muthassi (1971)
 Rathri Vandi (1971) as Aravindan
 Sthree (1970)
 Kaakkathampuraatti (1970)
 Ambalapraavu (1970)
 Priya (1970)
 Abhayam (1970)
 Kallichellamma (1969)
 Newspaper Boy (1955)
 Puthradharmam (1954)
 Baalyasakhi (1954)
 Aathmasakhi (1952)

References

External links

 Veeran at MSI

Indian male film actors
Male actors from Kozhikode
Male actors in Malayalam cinema
Year of death missing
Year of birth missing
Indian male voice actors
20th-century Indian male actors